Sericomyia sexfasciata is a species of syrphid fly in the family Syrphidae.

References

Further reading

 

Eristalinae
Articles created by Qbugbot
Insects described in 1849
Taxa named by Francis Walker (entomologist)
Hoverflies of North America